State Road 51 in the U.S. state of Indiana is a north–south route on the state highway system in northwest Indiana. Immediately north of US 30, the highway is signed as the Adam Benjamin Highway.

Route description 
SR 51 travels north on Lake Park Avenue from US 30, crossing Old Lincoln Highway and the mainline of the Canadian National Railway in the former town of Ainsworth before turning east on 10th Street in Hobart.  Turning north on Lincoln Street, SR 51 merges into Main Street before turning east again on 3rd Street in the downtown business district.  The highway follows 3rd Street to its end, turning north on Illinois Street and crossing the Chicago, Fort Wayne and Eastern Railroad's former Conrail line before turning east on Lillian Street.  Heading north on Indiana Street, SR 51 turns east on Cleveland Avenue, leading to the beginning of concurrency with SR 130.  Following SR 130 north, SR 51 reaches US 6.  At this point, SR 130 ends and US 6 turns north to run in concurrency with SR 51 to the junction with Interstate 80/Interstate 94 in Lake Station.  The concurrency with US 6 ends here and SR 51 continues north a short distance to its northern terminus at US 20.

No segment of State Road 51 in Indiana that is included in the National Highway System (NHS).  The NHS is a network of highways that are identified as being most important for the economy, mobility and defense of the nation.  The highway is maintained by the Indiana Department of Transportation (INDOT) like all other state roads in the state. The department tracks the traffic volumes along all state roads as a part of its maintenance responsibilities using a metric called average annual daily traffic (AADT). This measurement is a calculation of the traffic level along a segment of roadway for any average day of the year. In 2010, INDOT figured that lowest traffic levels were 6,630 vehicles and 136 commercial vehicles used the highway daily between Main Street and Cleveland Avenue, in Hobart. The peak traffic volumes were 28,916 vehicles and 1,112 commercial vehicles AADT along the section of SR 51 between I–80/I–94 and Old Hobart Road.

History 
Between 1918 and 1926, SR 51 went from SR 2 in Elkhart to the Michigan state line, now the route is State Road 19.  In 1926, SR 51 was removed from that section of roadway and it was signed as US 112.

There were plans to build SR 51 from State Road 10 to State Road 2, but that route was never built.

Major intersections

References

External links

051
Northwest Indiana
Transportation in Lake County, Indiana